Bad English is the debut studio album by British/American glam metal supergroup Bad English. It was released in on June 26, 1989.

The album was a massive success, especially because of the No. 1 single "When I See You Smile". That single was certified gold by the Recording Industry Association of America while the album was certified platinum. Aside from that song, the album had two other top 40 hits, "Price of Love" and "Possession", which peaked at No. 5 and No. 21, respectively.

Critical reception

The album received generally positive reviews.

RPM reviewer David Spodek called it "an LP full of enough hard driving rock and roll and power chords to please any AOR MD" and named "Forget Me Not" as the best cut. Rock Hard gave an extremely positive review, and called it the "best AOR album of the past six months".

AllMusic's Dan Heilman gave the album four stars, saying, "[A]mid some tailor-made power ballads lurks some decent hard rock." LouderSound writer Dave Everley gave the album four stars, explaining the rating with "Bad English marked the end of an era, but what a last hurrah it was".

Nonetheless, in 2016, "When I See You Smile" was ranked by Louder Sound as the 10th worst power ballad ever written.

Musician reviewer J. D. Considine wrote simply: "Grammar is the least of their problems."

In popular culture
"Best of What I Got" is featured during the credits to the 1989 film Tango & Cash.

Track listing

Charts

Album

Singles

(* "Best of What I Got" was released only to U.S. rock radio)

Certifications

Personnel 
Band members
 John Waite - lead vocals
 Neal Schon - lead & acoustic guitars, backing vocals
 Jonathan Cain - keyboards, rhythm guitar, backing vocals
 Ricky Phillips - bass, backing vocals
 Deen Castronovo - drums, percussion, backing vocals

Production
Richie Zito - producer
Phil Kaffel - engineer, mixing
Mike Fraser - mixing
George Marino - mastering

References 

1989 debut albums
Bad English albums
Epic Records albums
Albums produced by Richie Zito
Albums recorded at A&M Studios